Kanti Madia (or Kanti Madiya) was an Indian actor, director, producer and playwright from Gujarat, India. He established the Natyasampada theatre company, and directed more than 30 plays. He is particularly known for directing the Gujarati film Kashino Dikro (1979), his only film.

Biography
Kanti Madia was born on 7 March 1932 into a Jain family in the former princely state Lathi. In 1948, he entered in Bhavan's College, Mumbai where he won prizes for acting and directing. In 1952, he started his career in theatre. His first one-act play Raakhna Ramakada became instant hit. In 1959, he established Bohemians theatre company.

Although he received many offers from Bollywood, he directed only one film, Kashino Dikro (1979), which he adapted from the Gujarati short story, Dariyav Dil, written by Vinodini Nilkanth. The film was mainly noted for a moving portrayal of actress Rita Bhaduri. In 1980, Madia founded the Kavyasampada poetry club. He died on 15 June 2004.

Kanti Madia also acted in "Episode 42 - A Horse And Two Goats" of critically acclaimed Hindi TV serial Malgudi Days.

Writer Sanjay Chhel published a book on Madia in 2017. Its title was Mutthi Unchera Madia.

References

External links
 

1931 births
2004 deaths
Gujarati-language film directors
Film directors from Gujarat
People from Bhavnagar district